The 1954 Maryland Terrapins football team represented the University of Maryland in the 1954 college football season as a member of the Atlantic Coast Conference (ACC). Maryland, with its rout against Missouri, 74–13, set an ACC record-high for scoring that stood for 27 years.

Schedule

References

Maryland
Maryland Terrapins football seasons
Maryland Terrapins football